AudioFile may refer to:

AudioFile (company), a software company purchased by Delrina
AudioFile (magazine), a magazine that reviews audiobooks
AudioFile, a TechTV original series about music

See also
Audio file, format for storing digital audio content
Audiophile